Žahenberc is a settlement in the Municipality of Rogatec in eastern Slovenia. The entire Rogatec area traditionally belonged to the Styria region. It is now included in the Savinja Statistical Region.

References

External links
Žahenberc on Geopedia

Populated places in the Municipality of Rogatec